Code: Blue is a fictional organization appearing in American comic books published by Marvel Comics. Code: Blue was a New York City police SWAT team that was specially trained and equipped to deal with super-powered criminals.

Publication history

Code: Blue appeared in 1994's Marvel Double Feature...Thunderstrike / Code Blue and were created by Tom DeFalco and Ron Frenz.

Fictional team history

Feeling that conventional police tactics and SWAT teams were ineffective against some super powered criminals, Lieutenant Stone proposed a program to train and equip dedicated police officers to specifically deal with those types of menaces. Dubbed Code: Blue, their first assignment was to take down the Wrecking Crew. Surrounded by police while holding a hostage, the Wrecker attempted to use his newfound skill with Asgardian magic to find the rock troll Ulik, but his inexperience gave Code: Blue enough time to secure positions around the building and attack. The organized strike enabled the officers to free the hostage while slowing the Wrecking Crew down. Eventually, the Wrecker used his crowbar to teleport his allies away leaving Code: Blue to score their first mission as a win.

Code: Blue later traveled to Asgard itself with the help of Eric Masterson to aid in repelling an invasion.

Later, Code: Blue participates in sending well-meaning doubles of Earth heroes back to their home dimensions. The visitors had been taking a manner of vacation in Code: Blue's reality, at times pretending to be the heroes in question.

During the "Fear Itself" storyline, Code Blue establishes an internet presence as they send out valuable information after a supervillain breakout.

During the "Infinity Countdown" storyline, Code Blue recruits a new member named Chris Powell who has the superhero identity of Darkhawk.

Members
 Chief O'Grady - Police chief
 Captain Shelley Conklin - Police captain
 Lt. Marcus Stone - Commander
 Margarita "Rigger" Ruiz - Team armorer
 Julius Anthony "Mad Dog" Rassitano - Sharpshooter
 Daniel "Fireworks" Fielstein - Demolitions specialist and expert
 Andrew "Jock" Jackson - Personal combat specialist
 Samuel "Mother" Majowski - Tactical analyst (quadriplegic, uses a wheelchair)
 Warren Curzon - Police detective inspector

In other media
Code: Blue appears in the Fantastic Four: World's Greatest Heroes episode "Strings". Here, the NYPD under the influence of the Puppet Master send in the unit to arrest the Fantastic Four in the warehouse that they are hiding in. It is revealed that Mister Fantastic made all of the unit's weapons and armor as a precaution in case of a supervillain attack when they were away.

References

External links
 
 
 Code: Blue at Marvel.com
 Code: Blue at Marvel Wiki

Fictional organizations in Marvel Comics
Fictional police officers